Sealdah South section consists of a set of four lines which connect the  station in Kolkata with its southern suburbs and with the South 24 Parganas district of West Bengal, India. It is a part of the Kolkata Suburban Railway and is under the jurisdiction of the Sealdah railway division of the Eastern Railway zone of Indian Railways.

Services
The Sealdah South section consists of four lines:

 Sealdah–Diamond Harbour line
 Budge Budge branch line
 Canning branch line
 Namkhana branch line

The section is primarily a suburban section with a total of 334 daily services and 288 Sunday services serving the four lines of the section. A majority of the services are served by 12-car EMU rakes from the Sonarpur EMU Carshed. They are also served with a few 9-car EMU rakes from Narkeldanga EMU Carshed. There are many "Galloping local" services which only stop at important stations of a line.

The Gangasagar mela, which attracts thousands of pilgrims during Makar Sankranti in mid-January, and is held in Sagar Island is approached through the Namkhana branch line of this section.  and  railway stations serve as handy rail heads for travel to the mela. Eastern Railway runs a lot of special trains for the mela to cope with the increase in passenger traffic.

The under construction Line 2 and Line 3 of Kolkata Metro will provide major interchange stations at Sealdah and Majerhat as well. A new metro line from New Garia to Baruipur has been proposed as well.

This section connects to the Kolkata Port, via the KDS Railway, from where major freight commodities like containers, coal and fertilizers are loaded and transferred throughout the Indian Railways network.

History

Sealdah–Canning line 

In 1868, CSER having suffered extensive losses due to floods and other problems, sold the line to the Indian government (management then being leased to the Eastern Bengal Railway) and the company was dissolved in March 1870. Thus the line became a part of the Southern section of the Eastern Bengal Railway.

Post partition of India in 1947 and re-organisation of railway zones in 1952, the entire Southern section of Eastern Bengal Railway was amalgamated under the Sealdah division of Eastern Railway.

Sonarpur–Diamond Harbour line 
While multiple feasibility reports and proposals, beginning from 1839, were made for the construction of a railway line between Calcutta and Diamond Harbour, no action were taken on these.

This line, from Sealdah to Diamond Harbour, then became the main line of the Southern section of the Eastern Bengal Railway.

A small  branch line was constructed in 1883, from Diamond Harbour to Hara Fort near the Hooghly River to transport goods and military supplies as well.

Ballygunge–Budge Budge line 
The Budge Budge branch line was initially sanctioned in 1886 as a line to connect  with the Kidderpore Docks.

The Calcutta Port Commissioners' Railway (CPCR) built a branch line from Kidderpore Docks to Majerhat on 1893.

Baruipur–Lakshmikantapur–Namkhana line 

The line was extended up to Kulpi by 1992 and was completed till Kakdwip by 2001. The Kakdwip–Namkhana section was completed by 2004.

Kalighat–Falta Railway 

Gholeshapur was connected to Majerhat junction on the Eastern Bengal Railway on 1920. The railway line was closed on 1955 due to ever increasing losses. The tracks were dismantled and the land was reclaimed to build a road, now called James Long Sarani, in Behala.

Electrification
The Sealdah South section lines are fully electrified with 25 kV AC overhead system.

EMU Carshed 
The Sealdah South section is primarily served by 12-car EMU rakes from the Sonarpur EMU Carshed. They are also served with a few 9-car EMU rakes from Narkeldanga EMU Carshed. 

While the section was initially served by the Narkeldanga EMU carshed which opened on 1963, a need for a dedicated EMU carshed for the section led to the construction of the Sonarpur EMU carshed in 1978. This reduced the inconvenience faced by the overburdened Narkeldanga EMU car shed.

As of November 2021, the Sonarpur carshed had 32 12-car EMU rakes which exclusively served the Sealdah South section. The Narkeldanga carshed had 29 9-car EMU rakes, a few of which served the Sealdah South section mostly via the Circular line, while rest served the Sealdah Main and North section.

Routes and stations

Stations
Names in bold indicate that the station is a galloping train stop as well as important terminal station.

Sealdah–Diamond Harbour line

Budge Budge branch line

Canning branch line

Namkhana branch line

Planned extensions
Multiple new lines and extensions on this section have been planned by the Eastern Railway; however, most remain blocked due to land issues.

Budge Budge–Pujali–Uluberia (Birshibpur) line

Once completed this will connect the South Eastern Railway network under Kharagpur division directly with the Majerhat station in the Sealdah South section of the Eastern Railway via a bridge over the Hooghly river. As of 2021, work could not be started on this extension due to non-availability of land and as such the project had been kept under abeyance.

Kalikapur–Ghatakpukur–Minakhan line

However, work could not be started on this extension due to non-availability of land and as such the project had been kept under abeyance as of 2021.

Canning–Jharkhali extension 

A  extension from Canning to Bhangankhali was sanctioned in the 2009-10 railway budget with a railway bridge proposed over the Matla river. However, work could not be started on this extension due to non-availability of land and as such the project had been kept under abeyance as of 2021.

Planned branches to Raidighi and Durgapur

However, work could not be started on this extension due to non-availability of land and as such the project had been kept under abeyance as of 2021.

Namkhana–Chandranagar–Bakkhali extension

However, work could not be started on this extension due to non-availability of land and as such the project had been kept under abeyance as of 2021. 

Dankuni–Sagar Island rail line

While there have been multiple proposals to build a railway line to Sagar Island, none have been constructed yet. The below sections are supposed to be a part of the line if built:

 Pujali–Bankrahat–Diamond Harbour (Gurudasnagar)–Kulpi line: The  Pujali–Bankrahat line and the  Diamond Harbour (Gurudas Nagar)–Bankrahat line were sanctioned in 2011-12 railway budget. The  Diamond Harbour (Gurudas Nagar)–Kulpi line was sanctioned in 2012-13. As of 2021, work could not be started on this extension due to non-availability of land and as such the project had been kept under abeyance.
As of 2021, work could not be started on this extension due to non-availability of land and as such the project had been kept under abeyance.

References

5 ft 6 in gauge railways in India
Transport in Kolkata

Eastern Railway zone
Rail transport in West Bengal
Kolkata Suburban Railway lines
Railway lines opened in 1862